Nationality words link to articles with information on the nation's poetry or literature (for instance, Irish or France).

Events

1124:
 First draft of the Kin'yō Wakashū, an imperial Japanese poetry anthology, completed

1127:
 Second and final draft of the Kin'yō Wakashū, an imperial Japanese poetry anthology, completed

Works published

Births
Death years link to the corresponding "[year] in poetry" article. There are conflicting or unreliable sources for the birth years of many people born in this period; where sources conflict, the poet is listed again and the conflict is noted:

1121:
 Khaqani (died 1190), (approx.) Persian

1125:
 Lu You (died 1210), Chinese Song Dynasty poet

1126:
 Fan Chengda (died 1193), Song
 Anvari (died 1189), Persian

1127:
 Yang Wanli (died 1206), Chinese Song Dynasty poet

1128:
 Alain de Lille (died 1202), French theologian and poet, writing in Latin
 Ruzbihan Baqli (died 1209), Persian poet, mystic, and sufi

Deaths
Birth years link to the corresponding "[year] in poetry" article:

1121:
 Masud Sa'd Salman (born 1046), Persian

1123:
 December 4 - Omar Khayyám (born 1048), Persian mathematician, philosopher, astronomer and presumed poet
 Fujiwara no Akisue (born 1055), Japan

1125:
 Mu'izzi (born 1048), Persian poet laureate of Sanjar, master of the Persian panegyric qasideh

1126:
 William IX of Aquitaine (born 1071), an early Occitan troubador

1127:
 February 7 - Ava (born 1060), German poet

1129:
 Minamoto no Shunrai (born 1057), Japan

See also

 Poetry
 12th century in poetry
 12th century in literature
 List of years in poetry

Other events:
 Other events of the 12th century
 Other events of the 13th century

12th century:
 12th century in poetry
 12th century in literature

Notes

12th-century poetry
Poetry